Waxy skin is a cutaneous condition observed in roughly 50% of diabetic patients with longstanding disease.

See also 
 Diabetic dermadromes
 Limited joint mobility
 Skin lesion

References 

Skin conditions resulting from errors in metabolism